The Yamal–Europe natural gas pipeline is a  pipeline connecting Russian natural gas fields in the Yamal Peninsula and Western Siberia with Poland and Germany, through Belarus.

In Gazprom's development project nomenclature the pipeline consists of four sections,
Bovanenkovo–Ukhta,
Ukhta–Torzhok,
the western section from Torzhok also confusingly named Yamal–Europe, and the partly parallel SRTO–Torzhok branch section.

History
Planning for the Yamal–Europe pipeline started in 1992. Intergovernmental treaties between Russia, Belarus and Poland were signed in 1993. In 1994, Wingas started building the Poland section of the pipeline. The first gas was delivered to Germany through the Belarus-Polish corridor in 1997. The Belarus and Polish sections were completed in September 1999.

Construction of the Bovanenkovo–Ukhta  section started in December 2008, at about the same time drilling of the first production well in the Bovanenkovo gas field started. The total cost of building the pipeline has been estimated at $36 billion.

Polish gas price reviews

In 2012, a 10% reduction in the gas price for the Polish state-controlled oil and gas company PGNiG was agreed.

In 2020, the Stockholm Arbitration Tribunal ruled that PGNiG’s long-term contract gas price with Gazprom, linked to an index of oil and gas prices, should be changed to approximate the Western European gas market price, backdated to 1 November 2014 when PGNiG requested a price review under the contract. Gazprom had to refund about $1.5 billion to PGNiG.

During the 2021 global energy crisis, PGNiG made a further price review request on 28 October 2021. PGNiG  stated the recent extraordinary increases in natural gas prices "provides a basis for renegotiating the price terms on which we purchase gas under the Yamal Contract."

Polish pipeline section

In 2019, as part of Poland's plans to become energy independent from Russia, Piotr Wozniak, president of PGNiG, stated "The strategy of the company is just to forget about Eastern suppliers and especially about Gazprom." PGNiG intends to diversify supplies primarily through a switch to liquefied natural gas (LNG) supplies imported from Qatar, the U.S. and Norway, and possibly a pipeline to Norway, greatly reducing the significance of supply through the Yamal pipeline.

Transit on the Polish section of the pipeline onto western Europe was until 18 May 2020 enabled by a long-term transit agreement with Gazprom. Since then, in accord with the EU Capacity Allocation Mechanisms NC regulation 2017/459, transit is offered to all parties on a yearly, quarterly, monthly, daily and intraday basis. In July 2021 Gazprom decided not to book an annual contract, creating concern that Gazprom no longer planned to use the pipeline all year as a route to transport gas to Europe.

Disruptions
There have been at least seven interruptions, either complete suspensions or restrictions, in gas supply to Poland in the 18 years prior to April 2022. Depending on the type of incident, these interruptions that lasted from a few days to half a year.

On 6 November 2021, Reuters reported that gas delivery through the Polish section had been halted, or the flow has been reversed. According PGNiG, everything is fine from their point of view, as Poland received gas from both the east and the west, according to domestic demand and gas pricing. Russia has been accused of intentionally reducing gas flows to Europe for political purposes, but generally high Russian domestic requirements led to this situation.  On 9 November 2021, westward flows into Germany were re-established, and the Kremlin pledged again to increase the delivery of natural gas to Europe.

On 26 April 2022, PGNiG's press office informed that "Gazprom has formally applied to PGNiG with a letter on legal changes in the Russian Federation regarding the change in the rules of payment for gas supplies".

The Baltic Pipe between Norway and Poland will have the capacity to replace the roughly 60% of Polish gas imports coming from Russia via the Yamal pipeline, and  
At the end of 2019, the management of PGNiG decided not to extend the Yamal contract that was due to expire at the end of 2022.

On 26 April 2022, Gazprom announced it would stop delivering natural gas to Poland via the Yamal–Europe pipeline, as well as to Bulgaria, as both countries had rejected Russia's demand that payments for gas be made in Russian rubles - a demand allegedly constituting breach of contract. Poland said it did not expect disruptions in supply due to its natural gas storage facilities being about 75% full (ensuring 40–180 days of supply), the Poland–Lithuania gas pipeline becoming operational in May that year, the Baltic Pipe natural gas pipeline between Poland and Norway becoming operational in October. Poland can also import gas via the Świnoujście LNG terminal. , eastward flow of gas from Germany to Poland through the Yamal–Europe pipeline is stable.

Route
It is fed from the north-east by the Bovanenkovo–Ukhta, Ukhta–Torzhok and SRTO–Torzhok sections, which are all considered to be part of the Yamal–Europe pipeline. The German gas system is connected to the Yamal–Europe pipeline through the JAGAL pipeline.
The Bovanenkovo–Ukhta section involved a  undersea pipeline under Baydaratskaya Bay in the southern Kara Sea.

The western section of the pipeline was initially supplied by the slowly depleting gas fields in the Nadym Pur Taz District of the Tyumen Oblast and not from the Yamal project.
The SRTO–Torzhok branch section starts at Novy Urengoy, near the developing Urengoyskoye gas field within the Urengoy gas field complex.
As of 2020, the Yamal gas fields produce over 20% of Russia's gas, which is expected to increase to 40% by 2030.

Technical features
The pressure in the pipeline is provided by 14 compressor stations.

Ownership
The Russian section of the pipeline is owned and operated by Gazprom. The Belarusian section is owned by Gazprom and operated by Gazprom Transgaz Belarus. The Polish section is owned and operated by EuRoPol Gaz S.A., a joint venture of the Polish PGNiG, Russian Gazprom, initially with a 4% holding by Polish Gas-Trading S.A. It was agreed in 2009 that this small holding would be sold, leaving both partners with 50%.

Second pipeline
In 2005, there were plans to build a second leg of the pipeline. On 1 November 2007, the Russian minister of industry and energy Viktor Khristenko said these plans had been dropped, because construction of the Nord Stream 1 pipeline was preferred.

See also

  - oil pipeline that also flows through Belarus and Poland
 
 
  - 1980s gas pipeline to the south of Yamal–Europe pipeline

References

External links
 EuRoPol Gaz website
 Transmissions at IP Sudzha, 2018-2022

Belarus–Poland relations
Belarus–Russia relations
Energy in Poland
Energy infrastructure completed in 1997
Energy infrastructure in Poland
Gazprom pipelines
Natural gas in Poland
Natural gas pipelines in Belarus
Natural gas pipelines in Poland
Natural gas pipelines in Russia
Poland–Russia relations